Legendary is a 2010 American sports drama film directed by Mel Damski. The film stars Devon Graye as a high school wrestler, in a cast that features John Cena, Patricia Clarkson, Danny Glover, Madeleine Martin, and Tyler Posey. The film was released on September 10, 2010.

Plot

After being bullied, book-smart (but not street-wise) teenager Cal Chetley (Devon Graye), joins his Oklahoma high school's wrestling team, seeing it also as a way to reunite with his estranged and wayward brother, Mike (John Cena). His mother, Sharon (Patricia Clarkson), is not initially supportive of Cal's decision, especially when she discovers that Mike is secretly coaching Cal after she gets a call from Mike Chetley's jail cell. She has been away and without contact of her older son, Mike, for over 10 years, but copes and watches yet another family male become legendary.

Cast
 John Cena as Mike Chetley
 Patricia Clarkson as Sharon Chetley
 Danny Glover as Harry "Red" Newman 
 Devon Graye as Cal Chetley
 Madeleine Martin as Luli Stringfellow
 Tyler Posey as Billy Barrow
 John Posey as Coach Stu Tennent
 Teo Olivares as Donald Worthington
 Chris Whetstone as Mac Chetley

Production
WWE Studios produced the film alongside Samuel Goldwyn Films. Filming took place at Bonnabel Magnet Academy High School in Kenner, Louisiana in December 2009.

Music
Although no official soundtrack was released, the following songs appeared in the movie:

 "Blue Jeans" performed by Glass Cow
 "Crash" performed by Fit for Rivals
 "Dragonfly" performed by Shaman’s Harvest
 "Faith" performed by James A. Johnston & Laci Williams
 "Flash Lightnin’" performed by Flash Lightnin’
 "Hard Line" performed by James A. Johnston
 "Hustle, Loyalty, Respect" performed by John Cena and Freddie Foxxx (Also used in the trailer)
 "In the Morning" performed by Taddy Porter
 "It’s Your Last Shot" performed by Politics & Assassins
 "Letters from the Sky" performed by Civil Twilight
 "Liar" performed by Glasgow
 "One Night" performed by Golden State
 "Panis Angelicus" composed by Cesar Franch
 "Railroad Queen" performed by Taddy Porter
 "Take Back the Fear" performed by Hail the Villain
 "The Dream" composed & orchestrated by James A. Johnston with vocals by Jonathan Estabrook
 "Through Telescopes" performed by Colour Academy (Also used in the trailer)
 "Undertow" performed by Beta Wolf	
 "We Must Start Again" performed by Golden State

The orchestral score, written, and composed by James A Johnston, is available on iTunes.

Home media
The film was released on Blu-ray and DVD on September 28, 2010. The DVD is being sold exclusively at Walmart and the Blu-ray exclusively at Best Buy.

Reception
Critics received the film poorly. On review aggregator website Rotten Tomatoes, the film holds an approval rating of 19% based on 43 reviews, and an average rating of 4.8/10. The website's critical consensus reads, "Maudlin, predictable, and clichéd, Legendary pins its talented cast under a heavy layer of formulaic schmaltz." On Metacritic, the film has a weighted average score of 39 out of 100, based on 17 critics, indicating "generally unfavorable reviews".

Legendary failed to make the top ten at the box office in its only weekend in wide release, finishing with $200,393 in total.

References

External links
 
 
 
 
 
 

2010 films
2010s sports drama films
American sports drama films
2010s English-language films
Films shot in New Orleans
Sport wrestling films
WWE Studios films
Films directed by Mel Damski
2010 drama films
2010s American films